Duli may refer to:

Duli, Ardabil, Iran
Duli, Hamadan, Iran
Duli, Nepal
Duli language, an extinct Adamawa language of northern Cameroon